I Married a Monster from Outer Space is a 1958 American horror science fiction film from Paramount Pictures, produced and directed by Gene Fowler Jr., that stars Tom Tryon and Gloria Talbott. Paramount released the film as a double feature with The Blob.

The film's storyline concerns a young wife who begins to realize that her husband is not the man he was before they married. He has lost all real affection for her and for his new pet dog, which she gave him as a present. Thereafter, she quickly discovers that he is not the only man in town that appears to have changed. Now suspicious, she follows him one evening when he goes out for a walk and shockingly discovers that her husband is actually an alien humanoid.

Plot
After a year of marriage, Marge Farrell (Gloria Talbott) is despondent that her husband Bill (Tom Tryon) is cold and not acting toward her the way he did before they were married. He doesn't show any signs of genuine affection towards her or toward his new dog, a surprise anniversary present from Marge. The dog barks and snarls at him whenever he approaches; he kills it in their basement, telling Marge the dog was strangled by his collar while pulling on his tethered leash. She is also becoming concerned because, wanting a family, she has not become pregnant. After undergoing various tests, her doctor assures her that she can have children; he suggests that Bill come in and see him to be tested.

She soon notices that other husbands in their social circle are acting the same way. One night, she follows Bill when he goes out for a long walk. He heads to an isolated area in the woods, where she discovers that he is not the man she thought she married but an alien impostor. An extraterrestrial life form leaves Bill's body shell and then enters a hidden spaceship.

She confronts the alien Bill, and he eventually explains that all the females on his dead planet are extinct. He and the other males of his species are taking over human men so they can have offspring with Earth's women, saving their race from extinction. Marge is horrified at the prospect and tries to warn others of the alien plot, but too many men in town have already been taken over, including the town's Chief of Police, who does nothing after hearing her story. She attempts to call Washington, D.C., but all outgoing phone lines are busy. She attempts to leave by car and the local police stop her, saying that the only exit bridge which leads out of town is down.

Finally, her doctor (Ken Lynch) comes to believe her wild story, and he gathers up a posse of men he knows cannot be disguised aliens, having recently fathered children. They attack the aliens in their hidden spaceship. Bullets can't hurt the invaders, who are surrounded by a force barrier. The aliens, however, prove to be defenseless against a pair of German Shepherd dogs being used by the posse. The aliens are killed when the dogs attack, all except the alien Bill.

Entering the spaceship, the posse finds that all the human male captives are unconscious but still alive, including Bill. The men are each hooked up to an apparatus that helps the aliens become their captors while living in faux human shells. The posse begins to disconnect the captives, which kills the aliens one-by-one. Shortly before his faux human body is destroyed, the alien occupying the Chief of Police broadcasts a warning to his people in orbit that they've been discovered by the humans. Thereafter, a fleet of alien spaceships is seen leaving Earth space. They must seek out humanoid females elsewhere now that their breeding plan on Earth has been discovered.

Cast

Production
Both director Gene Fowler Jr. and screenwriter Louis Vittes had worked in series television and had some success. With I Married a Monster from Outer Space, both had some creative freedom, although Vittes was notoriously resistant to any changes to his script, to the annoyance of the leads. Principal photography for I Married a Monster from Outer Space began on April 21 and ended in early May 1958. The film marked Fowler's second directorial effort following I Was a Teenage Werewolf (1957). Prior to this, Fowler had worked closely as an editor for Fritz Lang.

Release
On September 10, 1958, the film premiered in Los Angeles, followed by its U. S. and Canadian theatrical release in October.

Critical response
Upon its release, I Married a Monster from Outer Space proved to be a hit with audiences and critics. Despite its modest budget and unpretentious production values, the film was ideal filler for drive-in audiences. Originally slated as the A film in a double feature with The Blob (1958), I Married a Monster from Outer Space was relegated to the bottom of the playbill because audiences preferred the intriguing full color monster feature over this monochromatic, more sombre, domestic invasion entry.

Due to its exploitative and sensationalized title, I Married a Monster from Outer Space has long been ignored by critics and film historians, although it received respectable reviews, both in contemporary and in later reviews. Variety'''s 1958 review wrote, "Fowler's direction, while sometimes slow, latches onto mounting suspense as action moves to climax. He gets the benefit of outstanding special photographic effects from John P. Fulton, which aid in maintaining interest." Harrison's Reports declared, "This latest addition to the current cycle of science-fiction-horror melodramas is just as fantastic as the others in its category, but it is more imaginative than most and should prove to be a good supporting feature wherever such pictures are acceptable." The Monthly Film Bulletin of Britain wrote, "This generally well-acted and -staged Science Fiction thriller, though novelettish in its personal story, has an intriguing situation and some effective, if rather sparse, trick camerawork." Danny Peary described it as "an intelligent, atmospheric, subtly made sci-fi thriller"  Tom Milne of Time Out magazine found "good performances, strikingly moody camerawork, a genuinely exciting climax", and Leonard Maltin called it a "pretty good little rehash of Invasion of the Body Snatchers" with "some nice, creepy moments".

The film is recognized by American Film Institute in these lists:
 2002: AFI's 100 Years...100 Passions – Nominated

Home media
In 2004 Paramount released a DVD of the film which, other than the open matte, full frame (1.33:1) format of the 1998 VHS release, cropped the original 1:85:1 image to the modern 16:9 (1.78:1) TV aspect ratio.

The label L'Atelier 13 released a Spanish language DVD under the title Me casé con un monstruo del espacio exterior.

In 2020, the film was released on Blu-ray through the Australian label Imprint.

ThemesThe Aurum Film Encyclopedia concluded that "while the film was clearly fueled by the Cold War mentality of the fifties, in retrospect it is its sexual politics that are more interesting, and disturbing". The hint at a subtext of "sexual angst" by Tom Milne is emphasized by German critic Georg Seeßlen, linking I Married a Monster from Outer Space and Attack of the 50 Foot Woman (1958) to film noir: Their subjects in common, states Seeßlen, are the distrust between the sexes and the depiction of marriage as a trap where the death of one partner seems inevitable. Sex is referenced continuously throughout the film, notes Cranny-Francis, and although the audience is aware alien-human coupling has occurred, the aliens fail when they cannot impregnate Earth women.

Film scholar Harry M. Benshoff suggests that the film features a blatant subtext of male homosexuality, citing the lead character of Bill's preference to "meet other strange men in the public park" rather than stay at home with his wife.

Remake
In 1998 the now defunct UPN television network produced and aired a remake of the film titled I Married a Monster'', with Richard Burgi as the alien husband.

See also
 List of American films of 1958

References

Notes

Sources

External links

 
 
 
 

1958 films
1950s science fiction horror films
American science fiction horror films
Alien invasions in films
Films about extraterrestrial life
Paramount Pictures films
1950s monster movies
1958 horror films
1950s English-language films
Films directed by Gene Fowler Jr.
1950s American films